White Bondage is a 1937 American drama film directed by Nick Grinde and written by Anthony Coldeway. The film stars Jean Muir, Gordon Oliver, Howard Phillips, Joe King, Harry Davenport and Virginia Brissac. The film was released by Warner Bros. on August 5, 1937.

Plot
Newspaper reporter Dave Graydon masquerades as a traveling "fix anything" repair man to infiltrate the organization of corrupt cotton gin and store owner Trent Talcott who cheats local sharecroppers.  After false assault charges and an escape from a lynch mob, Graydon exposes Talcott's schemes and the "croppers" receive compensation.

Cast         
Jean Muir as Betsy Ann Craig
Gordon Oliver as Dave Graydon
Howard Phillips as Cal 'Snipe' Sanders
Joe King as Trent Talcott
Harry Davenport as Pop Craig
Virginia Brissac as Sarah Talcott
Addison Richards as Kip Gillis
Eddie "Rochester" Anderson as Old Glory (uncredited)

References

External links 
 

1937 films
1930s English-language films
Warner Bros. films
American drama films
1937 drama films
Films directed by Nick Grinde
American black-and-white films
1930s American films
English-language drama films